Moëlan-sur-Mer (literally Moëlan on Sea) is a commune in the Finistère department and administrative region of Brittany in north-western France.

Population
In French the inhabitants of Moëlan-sur-Mer are known as Moëlanais.

Map

See also
Communes of the Finistère department
Jean Joncourt, sculptor of the local war memorial

References

External links

Official website 

Mayors of Finistère Association 

Communes of Finistère
Populated coastal places in France